Because scholars have tended to use the term in different ways, Biblical theology has been notoriously difficult to define.

Description
Although most speak of biblical theology as a particular method or emphasis within biblical studies, some scholars have also used the term in reference to its distinctive content. In this understanding, biblical theology is limited to a collation and restatement of biblical data, without the logical analysis and dialectical correlation between texts that systematic theology emphasizes.

Mark Bowald, writing for Grace Theological Seminary, stated that "four areas of focus" of theology "include biblical theology, historical theology, systematic (or dogmatic) theology, and practical theology".

Although the distinction existed prior, the beginning of biblical theology as a significant and separate discipline can be traced to J. P. Gabler’s 1787 address upon his inauguration as professor at the University of Altdorf, when he used the term and called for a separate discipline apart from the dogmatic emphasis of the confessions.

Some scholars focus on the Old Testament or Hebrew Bible and falls in the field of  Old Testament theology. The field started out as a Christian endeavor and aimed to provide an objective knowledge of early revelation, working as much as possible only with these biblical texts and their historical contexts, in the twentieth century it became informed by other voices and views, including those of feminist and Jewish scholars, which provided new insights and showed ways that the early work was bound by the perspectives of their authors.  Key scholars have included Walther Eichrodt, Gerhard von Rad, Phyllis Trible, and Jon Levenson.

Others focus on the New Testament; the field of New Testament theology likewise seeks understanding from within the bounds of these documents and their historical contexts. Key scholars have included Rudolf Bultmann, Hendrikus Boers, and N. T. Wright.

Evangelicalism

In Evangelicalism, biblical theology is a discipline of theology which emphasises the progressive nature of biblical revelation. Graeme Goldsworthy explains the relationship between biblical theology and systematic theology as follows:

The work of Gregory Beale, Kevin Vanhoozer, Geerhardus Vos (Biblical Theology: Old and New Testaments), Herman Nicolaas Ridderbos (The Coming of the Kingdom), Meredith Kline (Kingdom Prologue),  Graeme Goldsworthy (According to Plan, Gospel and Kingdom), Vaughan Roberts (God's Big Picture), James Hamilton (God's Glory in Salvation through Judgment), and Peter Gentry and Stephen Wellum (Kingdom through Covenant: A Biblical-Theological Understanding of the Covenants) have helped popularize this approach to the Bible. Especially important for bringing this field of study into the confessional tradition was Old Princeton theologian, Geerhardus Vos (Biblical Theology: Old and New Testaments). They summarize the message of the Bible as being about "God's people in God's place under God's rule and blessing" (in Graeme Goldsworthy, Gospel and Kingdom, Paternoster, 1981).

Biblical theology movement (1940s–1960s)
The biblical theology movement was an approach to Protestant biblical studies that was popular in the United States, particularly among Presbyterians, between the 1940s and early 1960s. Heavily influenced by neo-orthodoxy, the movement sought to escape the polarization of liberal theology and Christian fundamentalism. Important themes included: "1) The Bible as a theological resource; 2) The unity of the Bible; 3) The revelation of God in history; 4) The Bible’s distinctly Hebraic mentality; and 5) The uniqueness of biblical revelation." Scholars included G. Ernest Wright, Floyd V. Filson, Otto Piper and James D. Smart.

See also

 Christian views on the Old Covenant

References

External links
101 Books on Biblical Theology: An Annotated Bibliography -  Compiled by: Brittany D. Kim, Darian R. Lockett, and Charlie Trimm 
5 Things Biblical Scholars Mean When They Use the Term "Biblical Theology" - from Edward Klink and Darian Lockett's Understanding Biblical Theology
The Idea of Biblical Theology as a Science and as a Theological Discipline - classic definition of Biblical theology by Geerhardus Vos (1894)
BiblicalTheology.org - writings of Geerhardus Vos, who is sometimes called "the father of Reformed Biblical Theology"
Kerux: The Journal of Northwest Theological Seminary - has been printing biblical-theological material in the Calvinistic tradition since 1986
Beginning With Moses: The Biblical Theology Briefings - articles, essays and book reviews by various scholars in biblical theology
 The Reemergence of Biblical Theology: What is Going On? from Catalyst (United Methodist perspective)
 WWW Biblical Theology Index
Biblical and Systematic Theology: A Digest of Reformed Opinion on Their Proper Relationship
What is Biblical Theology? - an article by Rich Lusk on Biblical Theology.

 
Christian terminology